The Stockholm Cup International is a Group 3 flat horse race in Sweden open to thoroughbreds aged three years or older. It is run at Bro Park over a distance of 2,400 metres (about 1½ miles), and it is scheduled to take place each year in September.

History
The event was originally held at Ulriksdal as the Grand Prix. It was established in 1937, and was initially contested over 1,800 metres.

The race became known as the Stockholm-Löpning in 1951. Its prize money was increased significantly in 1955, and by this time its distance was 2,400 metres. It was renamed the Stockholm Cup in 1956.

There was no running from 1960 to 1962, and the race was transferred to Täby in 1963. Its prize was less than it had been previously, but it was raised again in 1975. The word "International" was added to its title in 1979.

The Stockholm Cup International was given Group 3 status in 1991. It was the first race in Scandinavia to be classed at this level. Täby Racecourse closed in May 2016 and the Stockholm Cup International was transferred to Täby's replacement, Bro Park, from the 2016 running.

Records
Most successful horse since 1959 (4 wins):
 Bank of Burden - 2011, 2012, 2014, 2015

Leading jockey since 1959 (6 wins):
 Fredrik Johansson – Kill the Crab (1996), Valley Chapel (2001), Farouge (2005), Appel au Maitre (2007, 2008), Without Fear (2013)

Leading trainer since 1959 (8 wins):
 Niels Petersen – Bank of Burden (2011, 2012, 2014, 2015), Without Fear (2013), Square De Luynes (2019, 2020, 2021)

Winners since 1985

Earlier winners

 1959: Orsini
 1960–62: no race
 1963: Camillo
 1964: no race
 1965: Romeo
 1966: Pan
 1967: Roman Tart
 1968: Landru
 1969: Scotch
 1970: Clovenford
 1971: Clovenford / Foghorn *
 1972: Moon Crack
 1973: Bill Waterhouse
 1974: Niardo
 1975: Tuloch
 1976: Tuloch
 1977: Brave Tudor
 1978: Nicke
 1979: Claddagh
 1980: Nicke
 1981: Russian George
 1982: Shaftesbury
 1983: Prima Voce
 1984: Nicke

* The 1971 race was a dead-heat and has joint winners.

See also

 List of Scandinavian flat horse races
 Recurring sporting events established in 1937 – this race is included under its original title, Grand Prix.

References
 Racing Post:
 , 

 galopp-sieger.de – Stockholm Cup.
 ifhaonline.org – International Federation of Horseracing Authorities – Stockholm Cup International (2019).
 ovrevoll.no – Stockholm Cup International.
 pedigreequery.com/ Winners of all the years – Stockholm Cup International – Täby.

Open middle distance horse races
Horse races in Sweden
Autumn events in Sweden